The 2019 CONMEBOL South American Beach Soccer League was the third edition of the South American Beach Soccer League (named natively in Spanish as the CONMEBOL Liga Sudamericana de Fútbol Playa), a continental league competition for South American men's national beach soccer teams. 

Organised by the governing body for South American football, CONMEBOL, as part of its Development Department's Evolution Program, all ten members of the continental confederation took part, with both senior and under 20s national teams participating in the league events.

The teams were first divided into two geographically based zones (North and South) to compete in a round robin tournament against other members of their own zone during the regular season; the points earned by both the senior and under 20s teams were combined. This season, the make-up of the zones was changed for the first time. The winners of each zone then proceeded to face each other in the finals to contest the title, scheduled for early 2020. However, due to the outbreak of the COVID-19 pandemic, the finals did not take place for over two and a half years, until May 2022.

Brazil were the two-time defending champions and successfully retained the title once more, defeating Ecuador in the finals.

Format

The league operated under the same format established for the inaugural season.

Calendar
The north and south zone event calendar was revealed on 7 August 2019. The finals were confirmed on 5 May 2022.

Teams

The ten member nations of CONMEBOL entered two teams each: their respective senior and under 20s national teams. In total, 20 teams competed.

For this season, CONMEBOL altered the existing composition of the two zones, deciding that Brazil and Peru of the north zone and Paraguay and Uruguay of the south zone, would swap conferences. (This effectively made Paraguay and Uruguay exclaves of the north zone as they are only bordered by nations of the south).

The numbers in parentheses show the South American ranking of each team prior to the start of the season (rankings only apply to the senior teams).

North zone

 (6th)
 (5th)
 (2nd)
 (3rd)
 (9th)

South zone

 (4th)
 (1st)
 (10th)
 (8th)
 (7th)

South zone

The South zone regular season took place in the Argentinian city of Rosario. All matches were hosted at the "Ángel Di María" beach soccer field, part of the Caribe Canalla sports and recreation complex on the banks of the Paraná River, home to Rosario Central Beach Soccer Club. Stands were installed with a capacity of 600.

The event was organised in cooperation with the Argentine Football Association (AFA) and the Rosarina Football Association (ARF).

The schedule was announced on 2 September.

Matches are listed as local time in Rosario, ART (UTC–3).

Standings

Results

Senior category

Under 20s category

North zone

The North zone regular season event took place in the Ecuadorian city of Manta. All matches were hosted at the Arena Olimpica de Manta on Playa el Murcielago (El Murcielago Beach). The event was organised in cooperation with the Ecuadorian Football Federation (FEF).

Matches are listed as local time in Manta, ECT (UTC–5).

Standings

Results

Senior category

Under 20s category

Finals
The zone winners play each other for the league title; their senior teams play each other over two legs, as do their under 20s representatives for a total of four matches comprising the finals. The winners are the nation which accumulates the most points from all four matches combined and are crowned league champions. 

The finals were originally due to take place in 2020. However, due to the outbreak of the COVID-19 pandemic, they were unable to be organised for over two years, finally being scheduled to take place in Playas, Ecuador, from 7–8 May 2022.

All matches took place at the General Villamil Beach Arena.

Matches
Matches are listed as local time in Playas, ECT (UTC–5).

Winners 
Brazil claimed a clean sweep in the finals, winning all four matches to win the series 12 points to nil and claim their third consecutive title.

With an unassailable lead after match three, the final match was played as a dead rubber.

References

External links
Liga Sudamericana de Futsal y Fútbol Playa – Regulations, at CONMEBOL.com (in Spanish)
Liga Sudamericana de Fútbol Playa CONMEBOL - Cono Sur (South zone), at Beach Soccer Worldwide

2019 in beach soccer
2022 in beach soccer
2019 in South American football
2022 in South American football
2019 in Argentine sport
2019 in Ecuadorian sport
2022 in Ecuadorian sport
South American Beach Soccer League